Cleveleys is a town on the Fylde Coast of Lancashire, England, about  north of Blackpool and   south of Fleetwood. It is part of the Borough of Wyre. With its neighbouring settlement of Thornton, Cleveleys was part of the former urban district of Thornton-Cleveleys and is part of the Blackpool Urban Area. In 2011 the Cleveleys Built-up area sub division had a population of 10,754.

History
At the start of the Second World War, several departments of the Ministry of Pensions, the Ministry of Education and the Board of Trade were moved to the Cleveleys area. Some were housed in the Rossall School briefly. An extensive site was developed for the Ministry of Pensions in the Norcross section of Carleton and all the government departments moved out in 1940.

On 1 February 2008, the MS Riverdance ferry, while undertaking a regular sailing from Northern Ireland to Heysham under severe stormy conditions, ran aground on Anchorsholme beach, close to the boundary with Cleveleys

Transport
Cleveleys is served by Blackpool Transport, who operate to Blackpool town centre, Mereside, Lytham, Bispham and Fleetwood, by Stagecoach North West, Cumfybus and Classic Bus Northwest, via the bus station.

Cleveleys is on the Blackpool Tramway. The tramway runs from Starr Gate in Blackpool to Fleetwood via Bispham and Cleveleys. There are five tram stops in the area, between the stops of Rossall School (Southern Fleetwood) and Little Bispham (Northern edge of Blackpool).

Amenities
Cleveleys has a number of pubs, including The Victoria Hotel, The Shipwreck Brewhouse, and The Jolly Tars, all on Victoria Road.

Between 1961 and 2004, the Children's Corner amusement park stood on Cleveleys Promenade at the end of Victoria Road West. It was demolished in the early 21st century as part of work on the town's sea defences.

References

Towns in Lancashire
Geography of the Borough of Wyre
The Fylde
Seaside resorts in Lancashire
Beaches of Lancashire